Mijikenda may refer to:
Mijikenda peoples
Mijikenda language